The 1917 Notre Dame Fighting Irish football team represented the University of Notre Dame during the 1917 college football season, led by fifth-year head coach Jesse Harper. The Irish won six of their eight games, with a loss at Nebraska, and a tie at Wisconsin.

This was the final season for Harper, who stepped away from coaching and returned to his native Kansas to ranch. Fourth-year assistant (and former Irish player) Knute Rockne was promoted to head coach for the 1918 season.

Schedule

References

Notre Dame
Notre Dame Fighting Irish football seasons
Notre Dame Fighting Irish football